Ashburton railway station is located on the Alamein line in Victoria, Australia. It serves the eastern Melbourne suburb of Ashburton, and opened on as Norwood on 30 May 1890. It was renamed Ashburton on 12 December of that year.

History
Ashburton station opened on 30 May 1890, and was on the first section of the Outer Circle line. Like the suburb itself, the station was named after Ashburton Terrace in Cork, Ireland, where councillor E. Dillon, who suggested the name, had previously lived.

By 1893, the northern half of the Outer Circle line had been closed and, on 9 December 1895, the line beyond Ashburton, connecting with Oakleigh was closed as well. For a short period, that left the line from Camberwell to Ashburton as the only remaining stretch of the Outer Circle line.

On 1 May 1897, Ashburton closed, along with the line from Camberwell. After an outcry from the local community, that section of the line reopened on 4 July 1898, becoming the Ashburton line once again. The line was electrified on 30 October 1924 but, in the years leading up to that, it was served by the popularly-named Deepdene Dasher, which ran a shuttle between Ashburton and Deepdene, and usually consisted of an F-Class engine and one or two American-type carriages. When the track was extended 600 metres to a new terminus at Alamein, on 28 June 1948, the Ashburton line became the Alamein line. Immediately north of the station, the double track becomes single for the rest of the section to Alamein.

A disused stabling siding is located at the Flinders Street (up) end of the station. In July 1989, timetabled use of the siding ended, due to the vandalising of trains stabled there. However, from time to time, maintenance trains used the siding during track works.

On 1 February 1996, Ashburton was upgraded to a Premium Station. Also in that year, the station was the first on the metropolitan railway system where the former Metcard ticketing system was trialed.

Platforms and services
Ashburton has one platform and is served by Alamein line trains.

Platform 1:
  services to Alamein; weekday all stations and limited express services to Flinders Street; all stations shuttle services to Camberwell

Transport links
Ventura Bus Lines operates one route via Ashburton station, under contract to Public Transport Victoria:
 : Glen Iris station – Glen Waverley station

References

External links
 Melway map at street-directory.com.au

Premium Melbourne railway stations
Railway stations in Melbourne
Railway stations in Australia opened in 1890
Railway stations in the City of Boroondara